Anella Olímpica is an Olympic Park located in the hill of Montjuïc, Barcelona, that was the main site for the  1992 Summer Olympics.

Facilities
The major facilities consist of the Olympic Stadium, the Palau Sant Jordi sports hall, the telecommunications tower designed by Santiago Calatrava, the National Physical Education Institute (INEFC) and the Picornell swimming pools. The Joan Antoni Samarach Olympic and Sports Museum is also located in the Olympic Ring.

The main promenade is located uphill, midway to the Montjuïc Castle. The complex includes the main baseball field opposite the swimming pools. Surrounding areas were grass covered, and green plastic obscured the view of the near Montjuïc Cemetery. This last move showed some opposition, as can be viewed as unnatural.

The original plan was designed around the main square, Plaça d'Europa and the Olympic Stadium. Rational and minimal, it is linked to water through pools and a transversal canal. The communications tower echoed at first the tubular lamps dispersed in the "Anella" and (again) an ensemble of concrete and steel tubes, the elegant sculpture near Isozaki Arata's Palau Sant Jordi. But then, the architect Santiago Calatrava lost a project in the city in the last minute and was commissioned weeks later to re-design the tower, now more futuristic, but maybe damaging the purity of the design.

References
1992 Summer Olympics official report. Volume 2. pp. 153–208.

Venues of the 1992 Summer Olympics
Olympic Parks
Olympic International Broadcast Centres
Sports venues in Barcelona
Sants-Montjuïc